Jung Da-Hwon (Hangul: 정다훤; born 22 December 1987) is a South Korean footballer who plays as wingback for Philippines Football League club United City.

Club career
Jung was drafted in the extras pick of the 2009 K-League Draft by FC Seoul. He did not play a first team match since joining in Seoul, and played mainly in the reserve team. On 24 July 2009, he made his first team squad debut in a friendly against Manchester United, coming on as substitute for Kim Chi-Gon.

After the end of the 2010 season, Jung became a free agent.  He subsequently joined Gyeongnam FC. On 5 March 2011, Jung made K-League debut against Gangwon FC in a 1–0 away victory.

In February 2019, he joined Gwangju FC.

References

External links

1987 births
Living people
Association football defenders
South Korean footballers
FC Seoul players
Gyeongnam FC players
Jeju United FC players
Asan Mugunghwa FC players
Gwangju FC players
K League 1 players
K League 2 players
Sportspeople from Daejeon
Chungbuk National University alumni